Ryley Stoddart (born 15 October 1999) is a professional Australian rules footballer playing for the Sydney Swans in the Australian Football League (AFL). He is a small defender. He made his debut in round 10, 2018 against the Brisbane Lions at the Gabba.

Stoddart originally played for the Eastern Ranges in the TAC Cup. Stoddart was drafted by Sydney with pick 53 in the 2017 AFL draft, and wears number 33. He was touted as a possible round one debutant by Swans captain Josh Kennedy. However, he was overlooked and later injured his back in a practice match against the GWS Giants. Stoddart signed a one-year contract with the club, tying him to the Swans until 2020. Stoddart was delisted at the conclusion of the 2020 AFL season after playing just six games for Sydney.

Stoddart signed with the Carlton reserves in 2021.

References

External links
 
 

Living people
1999 births
Sydney Swans players
Eastern Ranges players
Australian rules footballers from Victoria (Australia)